Arnold Buddy Grishaver (April 30, 1926 – November 9, 2003), known professionally as  Buddy Arnold, was an American jazz saxophonist.

Career 
Arnold took up the sax at age nine and turned pro while still in his teens. At 16 years old, Arnold performed at the Apollo Theater with the Georgie Auld Orchestra with singer Billy Eckstine. At age 18 he joined the Army and led an Army Dance Band from 1944 to 1946. Following this he played with Joe Marsala, Will Osborne (singer), Herbie Fields, Buddy Rich. His first recordings were in 1949 with Gene Williams and the Junior Thornhill Band with Claude Thornhill before leaving to study music and economics at Columbia University. In 1951 he began playing again, touring with Buddy DeFranco, then worked with Jerry Wald, Tex Beneke, Elliot Lawrence, Stan Kenton, and Neal Hefti. His debut album as a leader, Wailing, was released by Paramount in 1956. He did further work for the label with Phil Sunkel.

Arnold's career was sporadic after the mid-1950s, due in part to drug addiction. In 1958, he was imprisoned for attempted burglary but returned in 1960 after his sentence ended to play and record with Stan Kenton and the Tommy Dorsey ghost band. In the 1970s his old habits returned. In 1977 he was arrested in Pasadena, California, for forging prescriptions. In 2003, he died of complications from open-heart surgery at Cedars-Sinai Medical Center.

Musicians Assistance Program 

In the 1980s, he dropped out of music due to another prison sentence stemming from his addictions; upon his release he co-founded, with his second wife, Carole Fields (and the assistance of John Branca), an organization called the Musicians' Assistance Program or MAP for musicians with drug abuse problems. The program has helped many musicians from every era of music. In 2004, MusiCares acquired MAP and merged the two programs under the MusiCares banner.

Discography

As leader
 Wailing (ABC-Paramount, 1956)

As sideman
 Tito Puente, Mambos Vol. 5 & King of the Mambo, Vol. 6 (Tico, 1953)
 Stan Kenton, Adventures in Jazz (Capitol, 1961)
 Stan Kenton, Adventures in Standards (Creative World, 1961)
 Stan Kenton, Adventures in Blues'' (Capitol, 1963)

External links
 Buddy Arnold official Buddy Arnold tribute website

References

Eugene Chadbourne, 

1926 births
2003 deaths
American jazz saxophonists
American male saxophonists
Musicians from New York (state)
20th-century American saxophonists
20th-century American male musicians
American male jazz musicians